This is a list of properties and districts in Louisiana that are listed on the National Register of Historic Places.  There are listings in each of Louisiana's 64 parishes.

The locations of National Register properties and districts (at least for all showing latitude and longitude coordinates below), may be seen in a map by clicking on "Map of all coordinates".

Current listings by parish

The following are approximate tallies of current listings by parish. These counts are based on entries in the National Register Information Database as of April 24, 2008 and new weekly listings posted since then on the National Register of Historic Places web site. There are frequent additions to the listings and occasional delistings and the counts here are approximate and not official. New entries are added to the official Register on a weekly basis.  Also, the counts in this table exclude boundary increase and decrease listings which only modify the area covered by an existing property or district, although carrying a separate National Register reference number.

See also

List of National Historic Landmarks in Louisiana
List of bridges on the National Register of Historic Places in Louisiana

References

 
Louisiana
Louisiana history-related lists